Pauline Joyce Wendzel is an American politician from Michigan. Wendzel is a Republican member of the Michigan House of Representatives.

Early life 
Wendzel was born in St. Joseph, Michigan. Wendzel's family are farmers in Bainbridge Township, Michigan. Wendzel graduated from Watervliet High School.

Education 
Wendzel earned a Bachelor of Arts degree in Anthropology and specializing in Food Industry management from Michigan State University.

Career 
In 2014, Wendzel became a programs director at North Berrien Historical Museum.

Wendzel served as the assistant deputy clerk for Bainbridge Township.

Wendzel was a product brand development manager at Coloma Frozen Foods.

On November 6, 2018, Wendzel won the election and became a member of Michigan House of Representatives for District 79. Wendzel defeated Joey B. Andrews with 55.68% of the votes. Wendzel sponsored a bill which gained bipartisan support, a bill that focused on expunging minor traffic violations.

Awards and recognitions 
 2019 40 Under 40. Presented by Moody on the Market.

See also 
 2018 Michigan House of Representatives election

References

External links 
 Pauline Wendzel at gophouse.org
 Pauline Wendze at ballotpedia.org
 Pauline Wendzel at ourcampaigns.com
 Pauline Wendzel at michiganvotes.org
 Bill HB-4981

Living people
Michigan State University alumni
Republican Party members of the Michigan House of Representatives
21st-century American politicians
21st-century American women politicians
Women state legislators in Michigan
Year of birth missing (living people)
People from St. Joseph, Michigan